The DJK Ammerthal is a German association football club from the town of Ammerthal, Bavaria. DJK stands for Deutsche Jugendkraft, a sports organisation associated with the Catholic Church.

The club's greatest success came in 2012 when it qualified for the new northern division of the expanded Bayernliga, the fifth tier of the German football league system.

History
For most of its history the club has been a non-descript amateur side in local Bavarian football. The club played in the Bezirksliga Oberpfalz-Nord from 1993 onwards, earning promotion to the Bezirksoberliga in 1997 courtesy to a runners-up finish.

DJK made its first appearance in the Bezirksoberliga Oberpfalz, the highest league in Upper Palatinate and the sixth tier of the league system in 1997–98 but lasted for only one season before being relegated back to the Bezirksliga. It returned to the Bezirksoberliga in 2001 as a much stronger side and would play at this level for the next eight season. It finished in the top four on six occasions but missed out on promotion in the promotion round in 2007 and 2008 when it came runners-up in the league. In 2009 however promotion to the Landesliga finally came when it won the league.

The next three seasons the club spent in the Landesliga Bayern-Mitte which would also be the last three seasons the league existed in this format. DJK finished in the upper half of the table in each of those three seasons and a fourth place in 2012 was enough to qualify for the new northern division of the Bayernliga.

In the Bayernliga the club came seventh in its first season and twelfth in its second. After a fourteenth place in 2014–15 the club had to enter the relegation round where it lost to ASV Burglengenfeld and was relegated. Ammerthal bounced back immediately, winning its Landesliga division and earning promotion back to the Bayernliga.

Honours
The club's honours:
 Landesliga Bayern-Mitte
 Champions: 2016
 Bezirksoberliga Oberpfalz
 Champions: 2009
 Runners-up: 2007, 2008
 Bezirksliga Oberpfalz-Nord
 Champions: 2001
 Runners-up: 1997

Recent seasons
The recent season-by-season performance of the club:

With the introduction of the Bezirksoberligas in 1988 as the new fifth tier, below the Landesligas, all leagues below dropped one tier. With the introduction of the Regionalligas in 1994 and the 3. Liga in 2008 as the new third tier, below the 2. Bundesliga, all leagues below dropped one tier. With the establishment of the Regionalliga Bayern as the new fourth tier in Bavaria in 2012 the Bayernliga was split into a northern and a southern division, the number of Landesligas expanded from three to five and the Bezirksoberligas abolished. All leagues from the Bezirksligas onwards were elevated one tier.

Key

References

External links
 Official team site 
 Das deutsche Fußball-Archiv  historical German domestic league tables
 Manfreds Fussball Archiv   Tables and results from the Bavarian amateur leagues
 DJK Ammerthal at Weltfussball.de 

Football clubs in Germany
Football clubs in Bavaria
Football in Upper Palatinate
Association football clubs established in 1958
1958 establishments in West Germany
German Youth Power Sports Association